Archana Das (born 21 July 1988) is an Indian cricketer. She played in 11 Women's One Day International and 23 Women's Twenty20 International matches for the India women's cricket team between 2012 and 2014.

References

1988 births
Living people
Indian women cricketers
India women One Day International cricketers
India women Twenty20 International cricketers
Bengal women cricketers
Hyderabad women cricketers
Railways women cricketers